Stars is a computer graphics effect used by computer games. The effect takes the bright parts of a rendered image of the scene, and then smears them outward in a number of directions. The result is that bright areas have streaks emanating from them. Stars can be used to enhance blooming. The effect is also sometimes known as light streaks or just as the star effect.

External links
 Double Steal Fake HDR Rundown

Demo effects
Shading